Paranthrene chalcochlora is a moth of the family Sesiidae. It is known from Zambia.

References

Sesiidae
Fauna of Zambia
Moths of Africa
Moths described in 1919